Friedrich Heinrich Freiherr von Gottesheim (1749 in Geudertheim – 5 April 1808 in Prague) was a French soldier and Austrian commander in the time of the French Revolutionary Wars and the War of the Third Coalition.

Footnotes

References

Austrian Empire military leaders of the French Revolutionary Wars
Austrian Empire commanders of the Napoleonic Wars
Barons of Austria
1749 births
1808 deaths